Three figure skating events were contested at the 1920 Summer Olympics in Antwerp, but they were held in April 1920, four months before most of the other Olympic events at the 1920 Games. The figure skating competition took place at the Ice Palace of Antwerp.

Gillis Grafström of Sweden captured the first of three consecutive Olympic gold medals in the men's single event in 1920. 1908 gold medalist Ulrich Salchow finished fourth. At age 44, bronze medalist Martin Stixrud is the oldest man to ever win an Olympic medal in an individual winter event.

Despite receiving no first place votes from the judges in the women's singles, Magda Julin of Sweden captured the gold on the strength of three second-place ordinals. She was three months pregnant at the time.

Bronze medalist Phyllis Johnson from the UK had captured the silver medal at the 1908 Olympics with a different partner.

Medal summary

Medalists

Medal table

Participating nations
A total of 26 figure skaters, 14 men and 12 women, from eight nations competed at the Antwerp Games:

References

External links
  
 Skatabase: Men's Results
 Skatabase: Ladies Results
 Skatabase: Pairs Results

 
1920 Summer Olympics events
1920
1920 in figure skating
Figure skating in Belgium
Discontinued sports at the Summer Olympics
April 1920 sports events